Ye or Yecheng was an ancient Chinese city located in what is now Linzhang County, Handan, Hebei province and neighbouring Anyang, Henan province.

Ye was first built in the Spring and Autumn period by Duke Huan of Qi, and by the time of the Warring States period the city belonged to the state of Wei. During the Han dynasty, Ye was the seat of Wei Commandery and an important regional center. Ye was a political and economic center of China during the Three Kingdoms Period and Northern Dynasties. It served as the military headquarters of the warlords Yuan Shao and Cao Cao in the last years of the Eastern Han Dynasty.

As the years of war had destroyed the inner city of Ye, Cao Cao set about rebuilding the city in the mold of an imperial capital. He initiated a number of works in Ye, digging canals in and around the city to improve irrigation and drainage, building the Hall of Civil Splendour (文昌殿) which was to become the centerpiece of Ye's palace complex, and erecting  the Bronze Bird Terrace in 210 that became much-celebrated in Chinese poetry. Cao Cao's impact on Ye was so extensive that he alone, more than any ruler of the city before and after, is associated with the city of Ye in the Chinese cultural memory.

Shi Le made Ye the capital of his Later Zhao dynasty of the fourth century.

In the 490s, Emperor Xiaowen of Northern Wei moved his capital from Pingcheng (平城, in modern Datong, Shanxi) to Luoyang. This move was not welcomed by all. Antagonism grew between Xiaowen and his sinicized court and those who preferred to cling to the traditional Tuoba tribal ways, and it only increased with further changes calling for the abandonment of Tuoba dress and names. Eventually, under the leadership of Gao Huan (a Chinese general who was Tuoba in his ways and "outlook"), the sinicization-dissenting 'northern garrisons' mutinied and captured Luoyang in 534. "At three days' notice its inhabitants were required to accompany Gao Huan to his own base, the city of Ye...where he declared himself the first Eastern Wei emperor."  "During most of the sixth century Ho-pei (Hebei) was the heart of an independent state with its capital at Yeh [Ye]...." It remained the capital of the Eastern Wei dynasty and the Northern Qi Dynasty until 580. At that time Ye was being used by a resistance force led by Yuchi Jiong, which was defeated by  Yang Jian, founder of the Sui Dynasty, and the city was razed to the ground.

Some scholars, such as Ku Chi-kuang reported  that the Hebei region continued to harbour separatist sympathies into the Tang Dynasty. It was the region from which An Lushan launched his rebellion during the reign of the Tang Emperor Xuanzong. The city was razed after the rebellion's failure. 

Extensive excavations of the city have been made in recent years, allowing Chinese historians to make detailed plans of the site. In 2012, archaeologists unearthed nearly 3,000 Buddha statues during a dig outside Ye. Most of the statues are made of white marble and limestone, and could date back to the Eastern Wei and Northern Qi dynasties (534–577 CE).

A community of merchant Sogdians resided in Northern Qi era Ye.

References 

580 disestablishments
Ancient Chinese capitals
Archaeological sites in China
Major National Historical and Cultural Sites in Hebei
Populated places disestablished in the 6th century
Razed cities
Qi (state)
Cao Wei
Later Zhao